The Sieur de la Poippe was the Governor of Plaisance (nowadays Placentia) in the French colony of Newfoundland from 1670 to 1684.

External links 
 
Government House The Governorship of Newfoundland and Labrador
 Biography at the Dictionary of Canadian Biography Online

La Poippe